Anton Bolinder (3 June 1915 – 7 December 2006) was a Swedish high jumper. For this achievement he was awarded the Stora grabbars märke in athletics (number 264). He also won two national titles, in 1946 and 1948.

References

1915 births
2006 deaths
Swedish male high jumpers
European Athletics Championships medalists
People from Ljusdal Municipality
Sportspeople from Gävleborg County
20th-century Swedish people